The 1986 Cal State Northridge  Matadors football team represented California State University, Northridge as a member of the Western Football Conference (WFC) during the 1986 NCAA Division II football season. Led by first-year head coach Bob Burt, Cal State Northridge compiled an overall record of 8–3 with a mark of 4–2 in conference play, tying for second place in the WFC. The team outscored its opponents 307 to 198 for the season. The Matadors played home games at North Campus Stadium in Northridge, California.

Schedule

Team players in the NFL
No Cal State Northridge players were selected in the 1987 NFL Draft.

The following finished their college career in 1986 were not drafted, but played in the NFL.

References

Cal State Northridge
Cal State Northridge Matadors football seasons
Cal State Northridge Matadors football